Gladys Moore Vanderbilt, Countess Széchenyi (August 27, 1886 – January 29, 1965), was an American heiress from the Vanderbilt family and wife of Hungarian Count László Széchenyi.

Early life

She was born as Gladys Moore Vanderbilt in 1886, the seventh and youngest child of Alice Claypoole Gwynne and her husband Cornelius Vanderbilt II, the president and chairman of the New York Central Railroad.

She grew up in the Vanderbilt family mansion on Fifth Avenue in New York City and at their summer "cottage", The Breakers in Newport, Rhode Island. She attended Miss Chapin's School in New York.

Her first cousin was Consuelo Vanderbilt, Duchess of Marlborough, who had married Charles Spencer-Churchill, 9th Duke of Marlborough.

Inheritance
She inherited about $25 million from her father's estate and a further $5 million from her mother's estate. She also inherited The Breakers. In 1948, as a widow, she leased The Breakers to the Preservation Society of Newport County for $1 a year. She continued to maintain an apartment in The Breakers by agreement until her death. In 1951, she donated her mother's iconic Electric Light dress to the Museum of the City of New York.

In 1913, there were rumors that she was going to leave her husband due to his financial woes, including gambling away all of her dowry.

War aid
In 1914, during World War I, she placed her palace in Budapest at the disposal of the army.  Shortly thereafter, 600 reservists were quartered there, and she further intended to use the palace as a hospital.

Marriage and children

On January 27, 1908, she married Hungarian Count László Széchenyi (1879–1938) in New York City.  The couple visited Hungary almost every summer with their five daughters:

 Countess Cornelia "Gilia" Széchényi de Sárvár-Felsövidék (1908–1958), who married Eugene Bowie Roberts (1898–1983), an heir of the Roberts family of Bowie, Maryland (a colonial family of Maryland)
 Countess Alice "Ai" Széchényi de Sárvár-Felsövidék (1911–1974), who married Hungarian Count Béla Hadik (1905–1971)
 Countess Gladys Széchényi de Sárvár-Felsövidék (1913–1978), who married the English peer Christopher Finch-Hatton, 15th Earl of Winchilsea (1911–1950)
 Countess Sylvia Anita Gabriel Denise Irene Marie "Sylvie" Széchényi de Sárvár-Felsövidék (1918–1998), who married Hungarian Count Antal Szapáry von Muraszombath Széchysziget und Szapar (1905–1972)
 Countess Ferdinandine "Bubby" Széchényi de Sárvár-Felsövidék (1923–2016), who married Austrian Count Alexander von und zu Eltz (1911–1977)

Countess Széchenyi died in 1965. In 1972, the Preservation Society purchased The Breakers for $365,000 from her heirs.  Her daughter, Countess Sylvia Szapáry, maintained a residence at The Breakers on the third floor until her death on March 1, 1998.

Descendants
Through her eldest daughter, Cornelia, she was the grandmother of three – Gladys Vanderbilt Roberts (b. 1934), Cornelia Roberts (1936–1982), who married Count Hans-Heinrich von Coudenhove-Kalergi (1926–2004), and Eugene Bowie Roberts, Jr. (1939–2020). Through her daughter Alice, she was grandmother to Count László Hadik (1932–1973) and Count János Hadik (1933–2004). Through her daughter Gladys, she was the grandmother of Christopher Denys Stormont Finch-Hatton, the 16th Earl of Winchilsea (1936–1999) and the Hon. Robin Finch-Hatton (1939–2018). Through her daughter Sylvia, she was the grandmother of Count Pál László Szapáry (b. 1950) and Countess Gladys Vanderbilt Szapáry (b. 1952).  Through her youngest child, Ferdinandine, she was the grandmother of Count Peter von und zu Eltz (1948 - deceased) and Count Nicholas von und zu Eltz (1950–2012).

References

External links 
 

1886 births
1965 deaths
American emigrants to Hungary
American socialites
Hungarian countesses
Gladys
Gladys
Burials at Moravian Cemetery